Rhododendron bureavii, the Bureau rhododendron, is a species of flowering plant in the heath family Ericaceae.

The leathery leaves are elliptic to obovate-oblong, 6–14 by 2.5–5 cm in size. New leaf growth is covered in a fuzzy brown indumentum that remains on the underside of the mature leaves. In mid-spring, the Bureau rhododendron produces trusses of bell-shaped flowers. The flowers are pink in bud, fading to white when open, with purple spots on the interior. 

In cultivation in the UK, Rhododendron bureavii has gained the Royal Horticultural Society’s Award of Garden Merit. Like most rhododendrons it prefers an acid soil and dappled sunshine.

References

bureavii
Plants described in 1887